The 1987 Tanduay Rhum Makers season was the 13th and final season of the franchise in the Philippine Basketball Association (PBA).

Transactions

Notable dates
March 22: Tanduay overturned Great Taste on import David Thirdkill's shot with a foul from Michael Young in the last three seconds to escape with a 105-104 protested win in the second game of the season opener. The Rhum Makers rallied from 16 points down in the final quarter and Thirdkill intentionally missed his free throw and the ball didn't hit the rim, the referees failed to see the violation resulting to Great Taste's Ricardo Brown missing a hurried three-point attempt at the buzzer. 

April 12: David Thirdkill scored 61 points as Tanduay pulled off a 129-124 double overtime triumph over arch rival Ginebra San Miguel in their first meeting of the season. 

April 21: Willie Generalao struck with an off-balance desperation shot in the final second as Tanduay repeated over Great Taste, 121-120, and moved out front with six wins and one defeat at the start of the second round of eliminations of the Open Conference. 

June 2: David Thirdkill scored his personal-best and conference-high 72 points to power the Rhum Makers past Great Taste, 136-124, for their second win in three games in the semifinals of the Open Conference. 

June 9: Tanduay Rhum Makers overwhelmed Ginebra San Miguel, 122-104, to arrange a second finals meeting with Great Taste Coffee Makers for the Open Conference crown. 

July 23: Ramon Fernandez scored 40 points as Tanduay ends their three-game slump in the All-Filipino Conference with their first victory, a 118-115 win over Magnolia. 

October 6: After scoring only 11 points in his debut, Import Freeman Williams hit 10 three-point shots and finish with a season-high 82 points to lift Tanduay to a 129-122 victory over Hills Bros, now mentored by their former coach Arturo Valenzona. Williams' 82 point output was the league's all-time fourth-best at that time, behind Michael Hackett's 103 in 1985, Larry McNeill's 88 in 1983 and Lew Massey's 85 in 1982.

Championship
The Tanduay Rhum Makers won its third PBA title in the last four conferences by winning the Open Conference crown over Great Taste Coffee, four games to one.

Occurrences
Coach Arturo Valenzona was sacked and replaced by assistant coach Ely Capacio after Tanduay performed poorly in the All-Filipino Conference, winning only twice in eight games and were eliminated from the semifinal round. The Rhum Makers ended up last place again in the Reinforced Conference and bowed out with a humiliating 127-145 loss to Ginebra San Miguel on November 3. 

The following year on January 16, 1988, the Elizalde-owned ballclub announced that they are taking a leave of absence from the PBA.

Roster

Imports

References

Tanduay Rhum Masters seasons
Tanduay